The Hyrum and Selma Erickson Jacobson House, at 8908 South 220 East in Sandy, Utah, was built in 1914.  It was listed on the National Register of Historic Places in 1999.

It is a one-story brick cross-wing house, built upon a foundation of ashlar granite blocks.  Its original red brick exterior was painted red, and later the mortar joints between were painted white.  It has Victorian Eclectic details.

References

National Register of Historic Places in Salt Lake County, Utah
Victorian architecture in Utah
Buildings and structures completed in 1914